John Murray Glendenning (May 22, 1872 – March 17, 1962) was a politician from Alberta, Canada. He was born in Bennington, Ontario.

Glendenning first ran for a seat to the Legislative Assembly of Alberta in the 1909 Alberta general election in the new Nanton electoral district. He won an upset victory defeating Conservative party leader Albert Robertson whose old district was abolished due to redistribution.

Glendenning won a second term in office in the 1913 Alberta general election defeating Conservative challenger and Mayor of Nanton John Thomas Cooper.

In the 1917 Alberta general election he ran for a 3rd consecutive term in office but was defeated by independent candidate James Weir. He tried to regain his seat again in the 1921 Alberta general election but was again defeated this time by Daniel Harcourt Galbraith from the United Farmers of Alberta.

He died in 1962 in Calgary and was buried in Nanton, Alberta.

References

External links
Legislative Assembly of Alberta Members Listing

Alberta Liberal Party MLAs
1962 deaths
1872 births